The relictual karst gehyra (Gehyra calcitectus) is a species of gecko. It is endemic to Western Australia.

References

calcitectus
Geckos of Australia
Endemic fauna of Australia
Reptiles described in 2020
Taxa named by Paul M. Oliver
Taxa named by Leonardo G. Tedeschi
Taxa named by Ryan J. Ellis
Taxa named by Paul Doughty
Taxa named by Craig Moritz